Mario Aoun (born 1951) is a Lebanese physician and politician. He was a member of the Free Patriotic Movement (FPM) led by Michel Aoun. He was the minister of social affairs between 2008 and 2009.

Early life and education
Aoun was born into a Maronite family in Damour in 1951. He is a graduate of the University of Bordeaux and received a medical degree in endocrinology and metabolic illnesses in 1982.

Career
Aoun was the chief of service at Lebanese Hospital in Jeitawi in 2004. He also worked at St. Charles Hospital in 2004. In addition, he was FPM’s coordinator in Damour. Later he became the first FPM head of the Lebanese Order of Physicians on 31 May 2004. He served there until 2007. In July 2008, Aoun was appointed minister of social affairs to the cabinet led by Prime Minister Fouad Siniora and replaced Nayla Mouawad in the post. Aoun ran for a seat from the Chouf district in the general elections of 2009, but he could not win the election. Aoun's tenure as social affairs minister ended in November 2009, and he was succeeded by Salim Sayegh in the aforementioned post.

In the 2018 elections Aoun won one of the Maronite seats in the Chouf District within the electional region of the Mount Lebanon IV. On 10 September 2022, he resigned from the FPM because of his clash with Gebran Bassil.

References

External links

20th-century Lebanese physicians
1951 births
Free Patriotic Movement politicians
Government ministers of Lebanon
Lebanese endocrinologists
Lebanese Maronites
Living people
People from Chouf District
University of Bordeaux alumni